Bodyguard is a 2010 Indian Malayalam-language romantic comedy action film written and directed by Siddique. It stars Dileep and Nayanthara in the lead roles, while Mithra Kurian and Thiagarajan play supporting roles. This film was Nayanthara's comeback to Malayalam cinema after a gap of four years, and it is the first time that Dileep had worked with Siddique. The music was composed by Ouseppachan with popular choreographer-director Prabhu Deva choreographing the song sequences.  

The film released on 22 January 2010. It has been remade in four other Indian languages: in Tamil as Kaavalan and in Hindi, Kannada and Telugu. The Tamil and Hindi versions were also directed by Siddique .

Plot 
The film revolves around young Jayakrishnan, who has a very strange habit: he adulates anyone with a trace of heroism. Whenever he develops an admiration towards a person, he prefers to move with that person as a sort of bodyguard. He starts admiring Ashokettan, a former liquor tycoon and leading businessman. Jayakrishnan wants to be Ashokan's bodyguard, but Ashokan does not need one. Later, Jayakrishnan approaches Ashokan with a recommendation from someone he cannot refuse. He achieves his luck after saving Ashokan from danger. Jayakrishnan thus becomes the bodyguard of Ashokan's daughter Ammu. Jayakrishnan follows Ammu to her college as her bodyguard. Ammu and her friend Sethulakshmi get irritated with him following them all day.

Jayakrishnan takes his role as a bodyguard very seriously and follows the two girls around constantly. In an attempt to get rid of him, the girls make up a "fake lover", hoping to distract Jayakrishnan from his duties as a bodyguard, and their plan works. Jayakrishnan falls in love with "Private Number" and is constantly looking for this girl, but he has no idea that his lover is Ammu. Ammu, as a joke, calls Jayakrishnan and speaks badly about Ammu. Jayakrishnan gets a little angry and disagrees with her. He believes Ammu is a good-hearted person. That is when the viewer is able to tell that Ammu is really falling in love with Jayakrishnan.

Ammu later tells Jayakrishnan to run away with her and meet her at a railroad station. Jayakrishnan agrees, not knowing that the girl is Ammu herself. Ashokan finds out, and he believes that Jayakrishnan and Ammu are planning to run away together. In order to save Jayakrishnan's life, Ammu lies that it is not her. Jayakrishnan is meeting another girl at the station. Ashokan lets Jayakrishnan go but tells others to kill Jayakrishnan if a girl does not show up. Terrified, Ammu sends Sethulakshmi to the station and tells her to tell Jayakrishnan that Ammu is the lover and she will not be able to make it to the station. Sethulakshmi, seeing Jayakrishnan, falls in love and admits that she is the lover and not Ammu. Ammu calls her twice, but Sethulakshmi throws the cellphone out, trying to erase Ammu out of their love life completely.

Years later, after Jayakrishnan and Sethulakshmi's marriage, she bears a son but unfortunately dies. Before her death, she leaves a diary for her son telling the whole story between the phone calls and his father and Ammu. The son later goes to Ammu's house with Jayakrishnan to visit Ashokan. Jayakrishnan is shocked that Ammu is not married. The son asks Ammu to become his mother, and Jayakrishnan is shocked and angry at his son for saying something so blunt and rude. But Ashokan begs Jayakrishnan to take Ammu as his wife. So they go onto the train together, but the son runs and throws the diary into a trash can nearby. Jayakrishnan finds the diary and realizes that his real lover, the girl who has waited for him for so many years faithfully, was Ammu. The film ends with Jayakrishnan, Ammu, and the son hugging each other.

Cast 

 Dileep as Jayakrishnan
 Nayanthara as Ammu, Jayakrishnan's Love Interest
 Mithra Kurian as Sethulakshmi (Ammu's Friend) Jayakrishnan's Wife
 Thiagarajan as Ashokettan (Ammu's Father)
 Janardhanan as Balakrishna Menon (Sethulakshmi's Father and Jayakrishnan's Father-in-law)
 Harisree Asokan as Neelambaran
 Cochin Haneefa as Haridas, College Principal
 Zeenath as Radhamani (Ashokan's wife)
 Appa Haja as Rajeevan (Ammu's brother)
 Vyjayanthi as Mallika
 Guinness Pakru as Kudamaloor Balaji (Ammu's college mate)
 Nandhu as Ramankutty Master, Jayakrishnan's father
 Seema G. Nair as Meenu Teacher, Jayakrishnan's mother
 Rony David as Chandran, College Student
 Sidhartha Siva as Baiju, College student
 Pradeesh Nandan as Sandeep, College student
 Baiju Ezhupunna as Govindan

 Aneesh Ponnappan as Aneesh (College Boy)

Accolades

Music

Track listing

Remakes

References

External links 

2010 films
2010s Malayalam-language films
2010 romantic comedy films
Films scored by Ouseppachan
Films about bodyguards
Films directed by Siddique
Malayalam films remade in other languages
Indian romantic comedy films
Films shot at Varikkasseri Mana
Films shot in Ottapalam
Films shot in Munnar